Dirk Gijsbertus van 't Klooster (born 23 April 1976 in Amsterdam) is a Dutch baseball player.

Van 't Klooster represented the Netherlands at the 2000 Summer Olympics in Sydney where he and his team became fifth. Four years later at the 2004 Summer Olympics in Athens they were sixth. At the 2008 Summer Olympics in Beijing they were seventh.

External links
 

1976 births
Living people
Dutch baseball players
2006 World Baseball Classic players
2009 World Baseball Classic players
Baseball players at the 2000 Summer Olympics
Baseball players at the 2004 Summer Olympics
Baseball players at the 2008 Summer Olympics
Olympic baseball players of the Netherlands
Sportspeople from Amsterdam